The Ligier JS7 was the second Formula One racing car made by Ligier. As with the preceding JS5, the letters "JS" were in tribute to Guy Ligier's friend Jo Schlesser who was killed in the 1968 French Grand Prix.

Aside from using the Matra V12 rather than the usual Ford Cosworth unit, the JS7 was a very conventional design with a Hewland six-speed transmission and a longitudinally mounted engine and wishbone suspension. The JS7 forwent the giant air intake of the preceding JS5. The front wing design echoed that of the Ferrari 312T.

The JS7 competed in the 1977 Formula One season and the first two races of the 1978 season. An updated version, dubbed the JS7/9 was used for three races in 1978 until the definitive 1978 car, the JS9 was ready. Laffite's victory in the 1977 Swedish Grand Prix was the first all-French victory - chassis, engine and driver - in World Championship history.

Complete Formula One World Championship results
(key)

* 13 points scored using the JS9.

References

Ligier JS07